Unmanned underwater vehicles (UUV), sometimes known as underwater drones, are submersible vehicles that can operate underwater without a human occupant.  These vehicles may be divided into two categories: remotely operated underwater vehicles (ROUVs) and autonomous underwater vehicles (AUVs). ROUVs are remotely controlled by a human operator. AUVs are automated and operate independently of direct human input.

Classifications

Remotely operated underwater vehicle 
Remotely Operated Underwater Vehicles (ROUVs) is a subclass of UUVs with the primary purpose of replacing humans for underwater tasks due to the difficult underwater conditions. ROUVs are designed to perform educational or industrial missions. They are manually controlled by an operator to perform tasks that include surveillance and patrolling. The structure of ROUVs disqualify it from being able to operate autonomously. In addition to a camera, actuators, and sensors, ROUVs often include a “gripper” or something to grasp objects with. This may throw off the weight distribution of the vehicle, requiring manual assistance at all times. Sometimes ROUVs require additional assistance due to the importance of the task being performed. The US Navy developed a Submarine Rescue Diving Recompression System (SRDRS) that can save up to 16 people up to 2000 feet underwater at a time. Such a large vehicle with the primary role of saving lives requires an operator(s) to be present during its mission.

Autonomous underwater vehicle 
Autonomous Underwater Vehicles (AUVs) are defined as underwater vehicles that can operate without a human operator. Sizes can range from just a few kilograms up to thousands of kilograms. The first AUV was created in 1957 with the purpose of performing research in the Arctic Waters for the Applied Ph Laboratory at the University of Washington. By the early 2000s, 10 different AUV had been developed such as screw driven AUVs, underwater gliders, and Bionic AUVs. The earliest models used screw propeller thrusters while more recent models utilized automatic buoyancy control. The earliest model, SPURV, weighed 484 kg, went as deep as 3650 meters, and could travel for up to 5.5 hours. One of the most recent models, Deepglider, weighs 62 kg, can go as deep as 6000 meters, and can travel up to 8500 km.

History

1950s 
Starting in 1957, the first unmanned underwater vehicle (UUV) was classified as an autonomous underwater vehicle (AUV), and was created in the United States to research the Arctic waters. The Special Purpose Underwater Research Vehicle (SPURV), was used by the University of Washington to collect oceanographic data until 1979 during which the development of SPURV II began to provide better movement performance and better sensing capabilities.

1970s 
Scientists from the Autonomous and Control Processes Institute took interest in the developments of the AUV “SCAT” which led to the introduction of the UUVs “L1” and “L2” in 1974. “L1” and “L2” are AUV models used for the further development of technology and oceanographic mapping respectively.

1980s 
Further development of the Remotely operated Vehicle (ROV) brought forth the creation of the Autonomous and Remote controlled submarine (ARCS) in 1983 by the ISE ltd. company in partnership with the “International Submarine Engineering”. ARCS was also classified as a Remotely controlled underwater vehicle (ROUV) because of its 32-bit Motorola processor which allowed for the remote control it featured. This UUV further served as a testing platform, improving on the battery life, navigational, and communicational systems having its first dive in 1987.

1990s 
When the Russian Institute of Marine Technology Problems introduced the Solar Autonomous underwater vehicle (SAUV), it was the start of longer term exploration missions without the need of retrieving the UUV for maintenance. The introduction of solar panels on UUVs began with the SAUV in 1987 and was kept during the making of SAUV II. Solar panels enabled lengthier missions, with the ability to use features such as gps and high payloads more frequently due to its ease of charge.

Advancements in battery life enabled for the creation of “gliders” in 1995 which would allow for the long term dives in which the UUVs would remain submerged for weeks or even months at a time.

2000s 
UUVs begin to be taken into consideration for more than testing tools for other underwater missions due to the increase number of user internationally. There was also an increase in funding for the UUV technology development. The rise in users internationally led to the increase demand for UUV technology outside of government agencies and the commercial sale of UUVs started, expanding the research based use of the UUV to a more industrial/commercial based use.

2016 incident

On December 16, 2016, a Chinese warship in South China Sea seized an underwater drone that was in the process of being retrieved by the U.S. Navy survey ship USNS Bowditch. A day later, the Chinese Defense Ministry said it will return the drone to the United States. The Pentagon confirmed that and says the drone, used for gathering weather and temperature data, is not armed. The drone was returned several days later.

2020s

Design

Gliders 
External fins perpendicular to the frame of the UUV which allowed for a linear movement of the UUV and deeper, controlled dives. These gliders use buoyancy derived propulsion which increases the duration of dives and their range through up and down movement in the ocean.

Manta ray 
In September 2021, researchers at a Chinese university developed a manta ray shaped UUV with the purpose of collecting information around the Xisha Islands. Some UUVs are designed to mimic the silhouettes of animals to facilitate movement and prevent detection. The manta ray design allows the UUV to camouflage with the marine life and contributes to the ease at which the craft swims through water.

Oxygen/hydrogen air-independent propulsion 
UUVs are oxygen dependent vehicles which require to resurface. With the development of a propulsion unit that does not require oxygen or hydrogen, the ability for the UUV to stay continuously underwater increases drastically.

Lithium and water power source 
The newest source of power for UUVs could be the free energy reaction of Lithium/water as it produces 8530 Wh/kg. 5% of this energy would surpass the already established sources of energy densities found in today's UUVs. The power source would essentially consume the water around the UUV and manipulated it to produce energy through chemical reactions  which would power the UUV.

Applications

Military 
The US Navy began using UUVs in the 1990s to detect and disable underwater mines. UUVs were used by the US Navy during the Iraq War in the 2010s to remove mines around Umm Qasr, a port in southern Iraq.

The Chinese military uses UUVs for mostly data collection and reconnaissance purposes.

On December 20, 2020, a fisherman in Indonesia spotted a glider-shaped UUV near Selayar Island in South Sulawesi. Individuals from the Indonesian military have categorized the vehicle to be a Chinese Sea Wing (Haiyi), created for the purposes of collecting data including water temperature, salinity, turbidity, and oxygen levels that can help chart optimal submarine routes.

The navies of multiple countries, including the US, UK, France, Russia, and China are currently creating unmanned vehicles to be used in oceanic warfare to discover and terminate underwater mines. For instance, the REMUS is a three-foot long robot used to clear mines in one square mile within 16 hours. This is much more efficient, as a team of human divers would need upwards of 21 days to perform the same task.

A survey conducted by RAND Corporation for the US military analyzed the missions which unmanned underwater vehicles could perform, which included intelligence, reconnaissance, mine countermeasures, and submarine warfare. The review listed these from most to least important.

OODA Technologies, a data collection and analysis company, is highly interested in utilizing UUVs along the coasts of Canada. According to OODA, these unmanned craft provide much greater coverage of an area at a much lower cost compared to their manned counterparts. The quality of the data returned by unmanned marine vehicles is also stated to be much higher than that of traditional manned craft.

In November 2022, the Eurasian Times reported that China's Harbin Engineering University has developed trans-medium 'flying submarine' drones capable of both underwater and air travel, noting the potential military applications of the vehicles.

Implementations 
These examples of applications took place during the 2018 Advanced Naval Technology exercises, in August at the Naval Undersea Warfare Center Division Newport. The first example of unmanned underwater vehicles was displayed by Northrop Grumman with their air drop sonobuoy's from a fire scout aircraft. Throughout the demonstration the company used the: e Iver3-580 (Northrop Grumman AUV) to display their vehicles ability to sweep for mines, while also displaying their real-time target automated recognition system. Another company, Huntington Ingalls Industries, presented their version of an unmanned underwater vehicle named Proteus. The Proteus is a dual-mode undersea vehicle developed by Huntington and Battelle, the company during the presentation displayed their unmanned underwater vehicle capabilities by conducting a full-kill demonstration on sea bed warfare. During the demonstration the vehicle utilized a synthetic aperture sonar which was attached to both the port and starboard of the craft, which allowed the unmanned underwater vehicle to identify the targets placed underwater and to ultimately eliminate them. Ross Lindman (director of operations at the company's technical solution's fleet support group) stated that "The big significance of this is that we ran the full kill chain". "We ran a shortened version of an actual mission. We didn’t say, ‘Well we’re doing this part and you have to imagine this or that.’ We ran the whole thing to illustrate a capability that can be used in the near term." The final demonstration for unmanned underwater vehicles was displayed by General Dynamics, the company showcased their cross-domain multi-platform UUV through a theater simulating warfare planning tool. Through the utilization of this simulation, they showed a Littoral combat ship along with two unmanned underwater vehicles. The goal of this exercise was to demonstrate the communication speed between the operator and the UUV. James Langevin, D-R.I., ranking member on the House Armed Services Committee’s subcommittee on emerging threats, stated in regard to this exercise "What this is all driving to is for the warfare commander to be able to make the decisions that are based on what he thinks is high-confidence input quicker than his adversary can," he said. "That’s the goal — we want to be able to … let them make warfare-related decisions quicker than anybody else out there." These exercises were conducted to showcase the applications of unmanned underwater vehicles within the military community, along with the innovations each company created to better suite these specific mission types.

Film uses 
UUVs were also used to film a recent National Geographic documentary called "The Dark Secrets" of the Lusitania, the British ocean liner that the Germans sank during World War 1. To capture footage of the wreckage, the camera crew used a combination of submarines, remotely operated underwater vehicles (ROUVs) and underwater suits called Newtsuits.

Argo, a UUV developed by the Woods Hole Oceanographic Institute (WHOI), helped find the wreckage of the Titanic and was equipped with a set of television cameras to capture views of the ship. The vehicle had the capability to capture wide-angle film and zoom in for close views of the wreckage. Footage captured by Argo was included in the 1986 National Geographic documentary Secrets of the Titanic that details an expedition led by Dr. Robber Ballard and lets viewers take a closer look at the wreckage of the ship.

Deep-sea exploration and research 

Unmanned underwater vehicles can be used for deep-sea exploration and research. For example, remotely operated vehicles have been used to collect samples from the sea-floor to measure its microplastics-contents, to explore the deep-sea fauna and structures and discovering new underwater species.

UUVs are commonly used in oceanic research, for purposes such as current and temperature measurement, ocean floor mapping, and Hydrothermal vent detection. Unmanned underwater vehicles utilize seafloor mapping, bathymetry, digital cameras, magnetic sensors, and ultrasonic imaging.

The Woods Hole Oceanographic Institution employs a vehicle called the Sentry, which is designed to map the ocean floor at depths of six thousand meters. The vehicle is shaped to minimize water resistance during dives, and utilized acoustic communications systems to report the vehicles status while operating. Unmanned underwater vehicles are capable of recording conditions and terrain below sea ice, as the risk of sending an unmanned vehicle into unstable ice formations is much lower than that of a manned vessel. Glider type unmanned vehicles are often used to measure ocean temperatures and current strengths at various depths. Their simplicity and reduced operating costs allow more UUVs to be deployed with greater frequency, increasing the accuracy and detail of ocean weather reporting. Many UUVs designed with the purpose of collecting seafloor samples or images are of the towed type, being pulled by a ship's cable along either the seafloor or above. Towed vehicles may be selected for tasks which require large amounts of power and data transmission, such as sample testing and high definition imaging, as their tow cable serve as the method of communication between controller and craft. In 2021, scientists demonstrated a bioinspired self-powered soft robot for deep-sea operation that can withstand the pressure at the deepest part of the ocean at the Mariana Trench. The robot features artificial muscles and wings out of pliable materials and electronics distributed within its silicone body and could be used for exploration and environmental monitoring.

Science Direct claims the use of Unmanned Underwater Vehicles has risen consistently since they were introduced in the 1960s, and find their most frequent use in scientific research and data collection. Oceanservice describes Remote Operated Vehicles (ROVs) and Autonomous underwater vehicle (AUVs) as two variations of UUVs, each able to accomplish the same tasks, provided the craft is properly designed.

Ecosystem rehabilitation 
Companies like Duro AUS offer UUVs that can remotely collect and transmit water data for local governments. Duro helps the New York City government collect data around Randall's Island Park Alliance to monitor water quality and wetland health in the East and Harlem Rivers. Another project that Duro is undertaking is in conjunction with the Bronx River Alliance to help rejuvenate the river's wildlife. Using this data, state and local governments have made key decisions regarding the policies under the New York Ocean Action Plan for adjacent oceans, rivers, and estuaries.

Concerns 
A major concern with unmanned underwater vehicles is communication. Communication between the pilot and unmanned vehicle is crucial, however there are multiple factors that hinder the connection between the two. One of the major problems involves the distortion of transmissions underwater, because water can distort underwater transmissions and delay them which can be a very major problem in a time sensitive mission. Communications are usually disturbed due to the fact that unmanned underwater vehicles utilize acoustic waves rather than the more conventional electromagnetic waves. Acoustic wave transmissions are typically delayed between 1–2 seconds, as they move more slowly than other types of waves. Other environmental conditions can also hinder communications such as reflection, refraction, and the absorbing of signal. These underwater phenomena overall scatter and degrade the signal, making UUV communication systems fairly delayed when compared to other communication sources. Another system that utilizes acoustic waves is found in the navigation of these unmanned vehicles. A popular navigation system aboard these unmanned underwater vehicles is acoustic positioning, which is also faced with the same problems as acoustic communication because they use the same system. The Royal Netherlands Navy has published an article detailing their concerns surrounding unmanned marine vehicles. The Royal Netherlands Navy is strongly concerned with the ability of UUV's to evade detection and complete tasks not possible in manned vessels. The adaptability and utility of Unmanned Underwater vehicles means it will be difficult to predict and counter their future actions.
Over the last few years, projects like TWINBOT are developing new ways of communication among several GIRONA500 AUVs.

References

External links 
 Russia Says It's Working on a Drone That Can Imitate Any Submarine - The Surrogat - Saint 
 TWINBOT project
 GIRONA500

 
 
Articles containing video clips